Myrnyi is an urban-type settlement in the Yevpatoria municipality of the Autonomous Republic of Crimea, a territory recognized by a majority of countries as part of Ukraine and incorporated by Russia as the Republic of Crimea. The town's population was 4,052 as of the 2001 Ukrainian Census. Population: 

The settlement was founded in 1969. It received the status of an urban-type settlement in 1977.

References

External links
 

Yevpatoria Municipality
Urban-type settlements in Crimea
Populated places established in 1969